Isariya Marom, born December 18, 1995), or simply known as Teng, is a Thai professional footballer who plays as a left winger or left back for Thai League 2 club Trat.

Honour
Nongbua Pitchaya
 Thai League 2 Champions : 2020–21

References

1995 births
Living people
Isariya Marom
Isariya Marom
Isariya Marom
Isariya Marom
Isariya Marom
Association football defenders
Isariya Marom